Bicyclus suffusa is a butterfly in the family Nymphalidae. It is found in Angola, the Democratic Republic of the Congo and Zambia.

Subspecies
Bicyclus suffusa suffusa (Angola, Democratic Republic of the Congo: Lomami, Lualaba, north-western Zambia)
Bicyclus suffusa ituriensis Condamin, 1970 (Democratic Republic of the Congo: north-east to Ituri)

References

Elymniini
Butterflies described in 1921